Agonum deceptivum is a species of ground beetle from Platyninae subfamily, that can be found in the United States.

References

Beetles described in 1879
deceptivum
Endemic fauna of the United States